Kanakanjali is a Bengali television serial which used to air on Zee Bangla.

Plot
The show Kanakanjali is the story of Shuvro Chowdhury and his two daughters Sreya and Jhimli. Shuvro is the proud father of four children. His elder son Probal is a textile engineer and the younger son Promit is a management graduate. Shuvro, a saree dealer by profession, has always nurtured a dream that one day Probal and Promit would carry forward his business. Shuvro seems to have the picture perfect family envied by all. Life is fantastic till the time Shuvro realizes that Probal and Promit have no interest in appreciating the much nurtured dream of their father. A time comes when the two sons almost desert their father. An emotionally and financially bankrupt father has none for support. To his surprise, Shuvro has Sreya by his side who fights to get back the lost honour of her father.
Kanakanjali is the story of the relationships of a father with his daughters. It is the story of a happy family which crumbles down under the pressure of selfish interests. It is the story of a father in despair, whose honour is resurrected by his daughters. Kanakanjali, above all, is the story of two daughters who assure the parents of the Hindu patriarchal society that the daughters can become their support when they need them the most.

Cast
 Kanyakumari Mukherjee / Tilottama Dutta as Shreya
 Ritwik Chakraborty as Rupam
 Amrita Chattopadhyay as Jhimli
 Arindam Ganguly as Shubhro
 Roopa Ganguly as Nipa
 Aparajita Auddy as Ruma/ Pratima
 Kheyali Dastidar as Shreya's aunt
 Debshankar Haldar as Parimal
 Soumitra Chatterjee as Shreya's grandfather 
 Mita Chatterjee as Shreya's grandmother 
 Rajesh kr Chattopadhyay
 Swagata Basu 
 Swagata Mukherjee as Promeela

 Saswati Guhathakurta as Bina
 Dulal Lahiri as Rudro Mitra
 Tania Kar as Oindrila
 Soma Banerjee as Purobi
 Disha Ganguly as Rupsha
 Subhrajit Dutta as Neel

References

Bengali-language television programming in India
Zee Bangla original programming